Mershon is an unincorporated community and census-designated place (CDP) in Pierce County, Georgia, United States.

It was first listed as a CDP in the 2020 census with a population of 44.

History
A post office called Mershon was established in 1886. The community was named after  Martin L. Mershon, a local judge.

Demographics

2020 census

Note: the US Census treats Hispanic/Latino as an ethnic category. This table excludes Latinos from the racial categories and assigns them to a separate category. Hispanics/Latinos can be of any race.

References

Census-designated places in Pierce County, Georgia